The 2005 Conference USA baseball tournament was the 2005 postseason college baseball championship of the NCAA Division I Conference USA, held at Pete Taylor Park in Hattiesburg, Mississippi, from May 25 through 29, 2005. Both TCU and Tulane were declared co-champions due to inclement weather but Tulane was given the automatic bid to the 2005 NCAA Division I baseball tournament. The tournament consisted of eight teams, with two double-elimination brackets, and a single-game final that was cancelled due to inclement weather.

Regular season results

Records listed are conference play only. Marquette and DePaul did not field baseball teams. Charlotte, Cincinnati, Saint Louis, and Memphis did not make the tournament.

Bracket

 Bold indicates the winner of the game.
 Italics indicate that the team was eliminated from the tournament.

Finish order

All-tournament team

Notes

References

Tournament
Conference USA Baseball Tournament
Conference USA baseball tournament
Conference USA baseball tournament
Baseball in Mississippi
College sports in Mississippi
Hattiesburg, Mississippi
Sports competitions in Mississippi
Tourist attractions in Forrest County, Mississippi